Stoltz is a surname from Stolz a German noun meaning "pride".

 Conrad Stoltz (born 1973), South African athlete
 Eric Stoltz (born 1961), U.S. actor
 Gösta Stoltz (1904–1963), Swedish chess grandmaster
 Kelley Stoltz, U.S. singer, songwriter and musician
 Robert Stoltz (born 1976), Swedish footballer
 Roland Stoltz (1931–2001), Swedish ice hockey player
 Roland Stoltz (born 1954), Swedish ice hockey player
 Rosine Stoltz (1815–1903), French opera singer

See also
Stolz
Stolze

German-language surnames